Shang Ting 商挺 (1209–1288), also known as Shang Mengqing 商孟卿  and in old age as “The Old Man of Zuo Mountain” 左 山老人. was a Yuan 元 period writer of Chinese Sanqu poetry. He was also a noted calligrapher and landscape artist. Unfortunately, although a prolific poet, most of his writings have been lost. The surviving sanqu poems of the poet are all written to the same musical mode and song title. However, the content of the poems suggests they were written at different times. His son Shang Qi 商琦 was likewise an official and artist.

Biography
Shang Ting was from Shandong 山東  Province. Shang and his entire family were on familiar terms with the poet and statesman Yuan Haowen 元好問 (1190–1257). His uncle was the sanqu 散曲 poet Shang Dao 商道 (1193?-1258?). Shang Ting served the Mongol monarch Kublai before he took the throne. Later there followed an array of official appointments. When the Yuan Dynasty 元 was officially founded in 1271, Shang was appointed Assistant Administrator in the Secretariat. In later life, he was implicated in a wrongful death case and was imprisoned twice. He was later found innocent, but never again took an official position. He died at age eighty and many posthumous titles followed.

Translations 

(Shuangtiao 雙調 : Panfei qu 潘妃曲)

Untitled

Green willows with a wide flowing wind;

Peach and plum vie to shed blossoms.

The swallows are busy,

Pair after pair with bits of nest

Sport in the painted eaves.

Yellow willow leaves

Fine enough for a room's screen painting.

(Shuangtiao 雙調 : Panfei qu 潘妃曲)

Untitled

Depressed I climb the high tower to gaze out;

Green lotus leaves and red blossoms everywhere.

Summer days long

As Xuan plants and pomegranate flowers

Vie for fragrance.

Green gauze windows,

Fine enough for a room's screen painting.

See also
Chinese Sanqu poetry
Classical Chinese poetry
Classical Chinese poetry forms
Classical Chinese poetry genres
Yuan Haowen
Qu (poetry)

References 

Lu Weifen and Wu Gengshun ed., Complete Yuan Period Sanqu Lyrics, Liaoning, 2000, vol. 1, pp. 39–42.

Carpenter, Bruce E. 'Chinese San-ch’ü Poetry of the Mongol Era: I', Tezukayama Daigaku kiyo (Journal of Tezukayama University), Nara, Japan, no. 22, pp. 33–4.

Ma Liangchun　and Li Futian ed., The Great Encyclopedia of Chinese Literature, Tianlu, 1991, vol. 7, p. 5443.

Yuan dynasty poets
1209 births
1288 deaths
Poets from Shandong
Yuan dynasty politicians
Politicians from Heze
Yuan dynasty calligraphers
Yuan dynasty landscape painters
Painters from Shandong
13th-century Chinese calligraphers
Writers from Heze